Adrián Menéndez Maceiras (born 28 October 1985) is a Spanish tennis player. He has a career high-ranking singles of World No. 111, achieved in June 2015.

Menéndez Maceiras has reached the finals of fourteen Futures tournaments, winning nine of them. He has won four Challenger tournaments, lifting his maiden title at the 2007 Open Diputación Challenger in Pozoblanco, Spain defeating Dudi Sela in the final.

Challenger and Futures/World Tennis Tour finals

Singles: 32 (13–19)

Doubles: 35 (16–19)

Notes

References

External links
 
 

1985 births
Living people
People from Marbella
Sportspeople from the Province of Málaga
Spanish male tennis players
Tennis players from Andalusia